Arul Shankar is an Indian mathematician at the University of Toronto specialising in number theory; more specifically, arithmetic statistics.
He received his B.Sc. (honours) in mathematics and computer science from Chennai Mathematical Institute in 2007. He obtained his PhD from Princeton University in 2012 under Manjul Bhargava.

In 2018 he was awarded a Sloan Research Fellowship, one of the most prestigious early career research fellowships available to mathematicians.

References

External links
 Arul Shankar

Indian number theorists
Academic staff of the University of Toronto